The Last Resort: Greetings From is the third studio album by American country music group Midland. An expansion of their 2021 extended play The Last Resort, the album is their first since 2018's Let It Roll and was released on May 6, 2022, via Big Machine Records. Produced by Midland's longtime team of Shane McAnally, Dan Huff and Josh Osborne, the album was preceded by the singles "Sunrise Tells the Story" and "Longneck Way to Go", which features Jon Pardi.

Background
On July 16, 2021, Midland released The Last Resort, their second extended play which eventually served as the foundation for the album. The Last Resort, also produced by Huff, McAnally and Osborne, featured the tracks "And Then Some", "Sunrise Tells the Story", "Two to Two Step", "Take Her Off Your Hands" and "Adios Cowboy", all of which were subsequently included on The Last Resort: Greetings From.

The album was announced on March 4, 2022, alongside the release of the title track as a promotional single. When discussing the album, bassist Cameron Duddy explained to MusicRow that "we wanted ‘The Last Resort’ to be a track released before the album arrives because it's kind of a manifesto for everything else. You know sometimes the last resort doesn't mean you've run out of options, but more that you've decided you're going for the place or the thing that's going to set you free. That freedom of letting go and falling into space, giving it over to fate? That's where real living begins".

In an interview with People, Duddy stated "I really feel like it's our best, most mature-sounding record. The songs and the subjects are right there in the Midland lane, but I think we're exploring different things here and there. I'm not sure if that's coming across for the listener, but it certainly is for us. It feels like an evolution of sorts". In the same interview, lead singer Mark Wystrach expressed that he was initially cautious about the band's evolution on the album, noting "I'll be the first to admit that there were songs on this album that I didn't want to cut because I just didn't see it in the work tape. But once you get in the studio and you're able to start painting and adding colors and tones and textures, that's really when songs come to life. And that's what is so great. In the studio, you get to really bring in all these different paintbrushes."

Escapism is a major theme on the album, with the band explaining that this was influenced by the COVID-19 pandemic, which was occurring while a lot of the songs for the project were being written. Wystrach told Taste Of Country that being unable to tour "allowed us to dive back into a lot of music that we'd been listening to, all styles and types, and you're seeing all that on this record. You're hearing completely new textures and tones and instrumentation on this album, that we've never done before. We were trying to have a good time with a sad time, I guess, so that kind of set the palette, I think, for the rest of the writing and the album."

"Longneck Way to Go", which features guest vocals from Jon Pardi, was released as the album's second single on April 22, 2022.

Track listing
Track list adapted from AllMusic.

Personnel
From The Last Resort: Greetings From notes.

Midland
Jess Carson - acoustic guitar, electric guitar, vocals
Cameron Duddy - bass guitar, vocals
Mark Wystrach - acoustic guitar, vocals

Additional
Adam Ayan - mastering
Drew Bollman - mixing
Chase Duddy - engineering
Mike Griffith - production managing
Dann Huff - production 
David Huff - digital editing
Allison Jones - A&R
Steven Marcantonio - engineering
Shane McAnally - production
Justin Niebank - mixing
John Osborne - guitar (tracks 8–10)
Josh Osborne - production
Jon Pardi - vocals (track 7)
Lowell Reynolds - engineering
Claire Schaper - cover art
Chris Small - digital editing
Harper Smith - photography
Holly Taylor - packaging design
Michael Walter - engineering

Charts

References

Midland (band) albums
2022 albums
Big Machine Records albums
Albums produced by Dann Huff
Albums produced by Shane McAnally